Annabelle Collins may refer to:

 Annabelle Collins (Brookside), a character in Brookside played by Doreen Sloane
 Annabelle Collins (equestrian), Bermudian dressage rider